Centruroides alayoni is a species of scorpion in the family Buthidae.

Description 
Its sandy dull brown colour matches the surrounding environment, giving it camouflage protection. Its pedipalps are small relative to its size, indicating that it instead uses its stinger to subdue its prey. It has a potent venom, capable of killing a dog in a single sting, if not a human.

References

alayoni
Animals described in 1999
Arthropods of the Caribbean
Arthropods of the Dominican Republic